Phreatobius dracunculus is a species of catfish in the genus Phreatobius.

Phreatobius dracunculus was discovered from an artificial well in the village of Rio Pardo, located in the drainage area of the Rio Branco (Rio Madeira system, Amazon basin).

This small fish reaches a maximum length of  SL. P. dracunculus differs from P. cisternarum in a number of ways, but the main differences are the absence of eyes (which are present in P. cisternarum) and the lack of dark pigmentation in the skin (while in P. cisternarum some faint dark pigment is always present). These fish are light pink.

References

Fish described in 2007
Taxa named by Oscar Akio Shibatta
Fish of Brazil
Catfish of South America
Heptapteridae